Etlingera pauciflora is a monocotyledonous plant species that was first described by Henry Nicholas Ridley, and was given its current name by Rosemary Margaret Smith. Etlingera pauciflora is part of the genus Etlingera and the family Zingiberaceae. No subspecies are listed in the Catalog of Life.

References 

pauciflora
Taxa named by Rosemary Margaret Smith